Mark F. Giuliano is an American law enforcement official who served as the 15th Deputy Director of the Federal Bureau of Investigation from December 1, 2013, until his retirement from the FBI on February 1, 2016.

Early life 
Giuliano was born in Middleburg Heights, Ohio. He is a graduate of St. Edward High School and the College of Wooster, Ohio, where he studied economics and played football.

Career 
Giuliano joined the FBI's Washington, D.C. field office as a Special Agent in 1988, where he worked on the Safe Streets and Gang Task Force, and served on SWAT as an Assault Team Leader. While there, he received the Director's Award for Excellence in Investigation. In 1997, he was promoted to Supervisory Special Agent in the Violent Crimes Section at FBI headquarters, where he was responsible for the fugitive and Ten Most Wanted programs.

From 2005 to 2010, Giuliano served in the FBI Atlanta Field Office, Atlanta, Georgia, and during his tenure there, he served in Afghanistan as the FBI Commander on the scene. From 2010 to 2011, he served as the assistant director of the FBI Counterterrorism Division within the National Security Branch. From 2011 to 2012, he has served as the executive assistant director of the FBI National Security Branch. From August 2012 to November 2013, he served as the Special Agent in Charge (SAC) of the FBI Atlanta Field Office.

After retiring from the FBI in 2016, Giuliano joined Invesco as the company's chief security officer in Atlanta. He has since served as chief administrative officer and managing director of the company.

Giuliano was portrayed by Brian d'Arcy James in the 2020 miniseries The Comey Rule, which tells the story of the FBI's investigation into the Hillary Clinton email controversy and subsequent investigation into Russian interference in the 2016 United States elections.

References

External links

Deputy Directors of the Federal Bureau of Investigation
Living people
College of Wooster alumni
American people of Italian descent
People from Middleburg Heights, Ohio
Year of birth missing (living people)